Mars: War Logs is a cyberpunk role-playing video game developed by Spiders and published by Focus Home Interactive. The game is set on Mars and was released on April 26, 2013. It features a character who can specialize in stealth, combat or 'technomancy'. Spiders CEO Jehanne Rousseau has described the game as featuring a variety of companions and side-quests, as well as a world which reacts to the moral choices made by the player. On June 18, 2013 a new English localization was released for the game, containing rewritten game text and rerecorded dialog. A sequel, The Technomancer, was released on June 28, 2016.

Plot
The game is set on Mars, a century after a great upheaval. Powerful guilds battle over water, which has become a valuable resource. Two of the most powerful of these are Aurora and Abundance. The player takes on the role of Roy Temperance, an escaped prisoner of war who finds himself caught between a variety of powerful factions, and must also battle a variety of creatures created by the planet's radioactive environment.

Reception

Mars: War Logs has received mixed reception, with PC version scoring 59 out of 100 on Metacritic, based on 32 reviews, and 59.50% on GameRankings, based on 20 reviews, Xbox 360 version scoring 61 out of 100, based on 6 reviews, and 61.67%, based on 6 reviews, while PlayStation 3 version scored 60.00%, based on 2 reviews.

IGN praised the game as one that "shoots for the moon", saying it is "an attempt to pull off an epic in the style of Mass Effect or The Witcher 2 on a fraction of the budget." However they criticized the game's clumsily handled story line, silly "virtue" names like Morality or Charity, stiff characters and a lack of focus but stated that while it "isn't a great RPG, it is at least the seed of one – and a seed with some surprisingly green shoots sticking out of it." PC Gamer bemoaned the need to constantly "wrestle with an exuberant camera" and joked that the "combat can't remember if this is a third-person game or one where you don't really need to see anything at all." They also criticized the UI design, "stance" gimmick, uncanny valley facial animation, subtlety-free script, and a rushed final act. PC Gamer recommended the game however, saying "you should consider Mars: War Logs – a budget title that's more entertaining than all my complaints about it would seem to imply. There's also a B-movie charm. It's clumsily goodhearted, and has a couple of great moments where you feel like you're affecting the world. Every bit of it needs more time and money, but it's something of a surprise to find that I left the game genuinely fond of its big, fractionally-realised ambition."

References

External links
 Official website

2013 video games
Action role-playing video games
Cyberpunk video games
Hack and slash role-playing games
PlayStation 3 games
PlayStation Network games
Role-playing video games
Science fiction video games
Single-player video games
Stealth video games
Video games developed in France
Video games set on Mars
Windows games
Focus Entertainment games
Xbox 360 Live Arcade games
Video games using PhysX
PhyreEngine games
Spiders (company) games